Gordon Ion (born 26 August 1934) is a Canadian former soccer player. He was a standout player that played for several teams, most notably North Shore FC with whom he reached the 1954 and 1957 Canadian final. He was Canada's starting outside right in two matches during FIFA World Cup Qualifiers in 1957. He is an honoured member of the Canada Soccer Hall of Fame.

After making his Pacific Coast League debut in 1951–52, Ion won the Ed Bayley Trophy in 1952-53 as BC Soccer's most outstanding player in his first full year in senior soccer. At the start of the 1953–54 season, he played in the 1953 North American championship on loan with Westminster Royals FC, helping the Canadian club win the Jack Diamond Trophy over the Chicago Falcons.

From 1953 to 1957, Ion was a British Columbia all-star in five consecutive seasons. He helped British Columbia beat Northern Ireland in 1953 (he scored on a penalty kick) and Tottenham Hotspur in 1957.

Personal life
Gordon's son Greg Ion was a professional and international soccer player.

References

External links
 / Canada Soccer Hall of Fame
Canada Soccer Hall of Fame
Canada Soccer Records & Results

1934 births
Living people
Association football forwards
Canada men's international soccer players
Canadian soccer players
Soccer players from Vancouver